Harar Governorate was one of the six governorates of Italian East Africa. It was formed in 1936 from parts of the conquered Ethiopian Empire following the Second Italo-Ethiopian War.

The capital of governorate was Harar, but Dire Dawa was the most important city. In the territories around these two cities more than 10,000 Italian colonists went to live since 1937 creating some manufacturing industries (after the area was pacified from the Arbegnoch guerrilla). In November 1938 some territory of Harar in the Scioa region was given to the neighboring Addis Abeba Governorate, enlarging it to the Scioa Governorate.

The Harar governorate was subdivided in the "Commissariati" of Arussi, Cercer, Dire Dawa, Ghimir, Giggiga, Goba, Harar and Adama.

Bibliography
Annuario Generale 1938-XVI , Consociazione Turistica Italiana, Milan, 1938

See also 
Italian East Africa
Italian Ethiopia
List of Governors of the Harar Governornate

Governorates of Italian East Africa